This is a list of narrow-gauge locomotives that have been or are being operated by Indian Railways. All railways except the heritage ones are closed or under conversion/are converted to the nation-wide standard  gauge, under Project Unigauge. So narrow-gauge locomotives are operating only on the heritage routes as of 2021.

General 

 ZDM-1: This locomotive was built by Arn. Jung. These were called the class DZ on NR (Kalka-Shimla Railway). This was a narrow-gauge locomotive with 2ft 6in (762 mm) wide gauge. It was identical to NDM-1 class with 2'0" gauge. Only four of these locos were regauged to 2'0" gauge and converted to NDM-1 units. When the ZDM-3 locos were available in (1972-1982). The fifth loco NR #704, was used at Pragati Maidan in New Delhi, where it was used to haul a short train with the name Pragati Express with  aluminium-bodied coaches on a 1.5km figure-8 track at a exhibition centre specially during IITF. Loco numbers were not written on the body of the loco.

 ZDM-2: This was a narrow-gauge locomotive with 2ft 6in (762 mm) wide gauge. These loco were mainly used in Nainpur-Gondia section narrow-gauge route. All the locomotives are retired/withdrawn from service.

 ZDM-3: This is a narrow-gauge locomotive with 2ft 6in (762 mm) wide gauge of Indian Railways. This locomotives can be found on the routes of Kalka-Shimla route and Kangra Valley route.

 ZDM-4: This locomotives were built by CLW and they were the modified version of ZDM-3 class with an extra axle to reduce axle load (1-B-B-1 bogies). But this extra axle caused wheel slip. This locomotives can be found on routes like Kangra Valley and were found earlier on the Nagpur narrow-gauge routes and Raipur narrow-gauge routes. This iss a narrow-gauge locomotive with 2ft 6in (762 mm) wide gauge.
ZDM-4A: This was a variant of the ZDM-4 loco. This loco was used in Barsi Light Railway. These 1-B-B-1 locos had a 700hp power-pack. In 1996 one of this was sent to Nepal Jayanagar-Janakpur railway line. This was a narrow-gauge locomotive with 2ft 6in (762 mm) wide gauge.

 ZDM-5: This locomotive was one of the powerful narrow-gauge locomotives of the world. This locomotives were operated on routes like Pratapnagar narrow-gauge and Dhaulpur narrow-gauge routes. Four locos of this class were sent to work on Jayanagar-Janakpur railway in Nepal in 1994. All the locomotives are retired/withdrawn from service. This was a narrow-gauge locomotive with 2ft 6in (762 mm) wide gauge.

 NDM-1: This is a articulated locomotive with two prime movers. But in case of uphill travel it uses its both engines and in case of downhill it uses one engine on Neral-Matheran line. It was originally intended to be used in Kalka-Shimla route. This is a narrow-gauge locomotive with 2ft 0in (610 mm) wide gauge. When Kalka-Shimla route was regauged ZDM-3 was obtained for that route.

 NDM-5: This locomotives were used on Central Railways Gwalior narrow-gauge route. This locomotives were based on another narrow-gauge locomotive called ZDM-5. It had been equipped with dual brake system. All the locomotives are retired/withdrawn from service. This was a narrow-gauge locomotive with 2ft 0in (610 mm) wide gauge.

 NDM-6: This locomotive was originally intended for Matheran Hill Railway but due to some reason it was then allocated to Darjeeling Himalayan Railway. Only 6 of these locomotives have been made and all are in service on Darjeeling Himalayan Railway. This is a narrow-gauge locomotive with  gauge.

 NBM-1: This locomotives were used on Central Railways Gwalior narrow-gauge route. This were the battery electric locomotives which are similar to YAM-1 locomotives. Only three units were built in 1987. All the locomotives are retired/withdrawn from service. This was a narrow-gauge locomotive with 2ft 0in (610 mm) wide gauge.

Specifications

Units produced and in service

See also
Locomotives of India

References

Bibliography

Narrow
Arnold Jung locomotives
B-B locomotives
locomotives